Abiyyu Fauzan Majid (born 7 May 1999) is an Indonesian badminton player.

Achievements

BWF International Challenge/Series (1 title) 
Men's doubles

  BWF International Challenge tournament
  BWF International Series tournament
  BWF Future Series tournament

Performance timeline

Individual competitions

Senior level 
 Men's doubles

External links

References 

1999 births
Living people
Indonesian male badminton players
21st-century Indonesian people